Chamber of Secrets may refer to:
 Great Pyramid of Giza, the Chamber of Secrets inside The Great Pyramid of Giza in Egypt, approx. 2500 BCE 
 Solomon's Temple, Chamber of Secrets in Solomon's Temple, built 953 BCE

Chamber of Secrets may also refer to the location at Hogwarts, a fictional school in the Harry Potter series by J.K. Rowling
 Harry Potter and the Chamber of Secrets, the second novel in the Harry Potter series
 Harry Potter and the Chamber of Secrets (film), a film adaptation of the novel directed by Chris Columbus
 Harry Potter and the Chamber of Secrets (soundtrack), the soundtrack to the film composed by John Williams
 Harry Potter and the Chamber of Secrets (video game), the game based on the film